Jip Vastenburg (born 21 March 1994 in Loosdrecht) is a Dutch athlete competing in the long-distance events. She finished fourth in the 10,000 metres at the 2014 European Championships. In addition, she won the gold at the 2015 European U23 Championships.

Competition record

Personal bests
Outdoor
1500 metres – 4:10.11 (Heusden-Zolder 2014)
3000 metres – 8:49.50 (Hengelo 2015)
5000 metres – 15:15.77 (Heusden-Zolder 2018)
10,000 metres – 31:35.48 (Palo Alto 2015)
Half marathon – 1:13:15 (Hague 2014)

References

1994 births
Living people
Dutch female long-distance runners
People from Wijdemeren
World Athletics Championships athletes for the Netherlands
Athletes (track and field) at the 2016 Summer Olympics
Olympic athletes of the Netherlands
Sportspeople from North Holland
20th-century Dutch women
21st-century Dutch women